Furlough is a 2018 American comedy-drama film starring Tessa Thompson, Melissa Leo, Whoopi Goldberg and Anna Paquin.  The film was directed by Laurie Collyer, written by Barry Strugatz and produced by Leo; James Schamus served as an executive producer.

Plot 

A young woman works part time at a prison while also caring for her mother. The rookie guard gets a chance to prove her mettle when she's tasked with accompanying a hellraising inmate on an emergency furlough to visit her dying mother. But things soon spiral out of control, sending the pair on a surprisingly touching road trip.

Cast
Tessa Thompson as Nicole Stevens
Melissa Leo as Joan Anderson
Whoopi Goldberg as Mrs. Stevens
Anna Paquin as Lily Benson
Édgar Ramírez as Kevin Rivera
La La Anthony as Brandy
Erik Griffin as Warden Borden
Drena De Niro as Linda

Reception

References

External links
 
 
 

American comedy-drama films
IFC Films films
2018 comedy-drama films
2010s English-language films
2010s American films